Double Dead (Redux) is a CD/DVD Set by death metal band Six Feet Under.  It was released in 2003 on Metal Blade Records.

Track listing

CD
"The Day The Dead Walked"
"The Murderers"
"Waiting For Decay"
"Impulse To Disembowel"
"Feasting On The Blood Of The Insane"
"No Warning Shot"
"Silent Violence"
"The Enemy Inside"
"Victim Of The Paranoid"
"Journey Into Darkness"
"Revenge Of The Zombie"
"Manipulation"
"Torn To The Bone"
"4:20"
"Bonesaw"
"Hacked To Pieces"

DVD
"The Day The Dead Walked"
"The Murderers"
"Waiting For Decay"
"Impulse To Disembowel"
"Feasting On The Blood Of The Insane"
"No Warning Shot"
"Silent Violence"
"The Enemy Inside"
"Victim Of The Paranoid"
"Manipulation"
"Torn To The Bone"
"4:20"
"Bonesaw"
"Torture Killer"

Double Dead (CD/DVD Set)

Double Dead is a CD/DVD Set by death metal band Six Feet Under.  It was released in 2002 on Metal Blade Records.

Personnel
 Chris Barnes - Vocals
 Steve Swanson - Guitars
 Terry Butler - Bass
 Greg Gall - Drums

See also

Six Feet Under
Chris Barnes

External links
 Six Feet Under's Home Page

Six Feet Under (band) video albums
Metal Blade Records albums
2005 video albums
2005 albums
Metal Blade Records video albums